Events in the year 2016 in Madagascar.

Incumbents
President: Hery Rajaonarimampianina 
Prime Minister: Jean Ravelonarivo (until April 13), Olivier Mahafaly Solonandrasana (starting April 13)

Events

April
 April 11 - Jean Ravelonarivo left office as Prime Minister
 April 11 - Olivier Mahafaly Solonandrasana took office as Prime Minister

References 

 
2010s in Madagascar 
Years of the 21st century in Madagascar
Madagascar
Madagascar